Metropole Télévision SA, commonly known as Groupe M6, is a French media holding company. It was formed around the commercial television channel M6, launched in March 1987 by the CLT (RTL Télévision) and La Lyonnaise des Eaux.

In addition to its audiovisual and digital media presence, some of the group's television channels are operated (including M6, W9, 6ter, Paris Première, Téva, Série Club) as well as the television channels of the Lagardères (Gulli, Canal J, TiJi, MCM, MCM Top and RFM TV), radio stations (RTL, RTL2 and Fun Radio), and film and television production and distribution companies. The company has also been presenting information and services on the Internet, including online video and computer companies. Since 1999, the group has also diversified into publishing, music and show production, distance selling, and sport with the Football Club of the Girondins de Bordeaux.

In May 2021, Groupe M6 and TF1 Group announced that they had begun negotiations for a proposed merger. On September 16, 2022, the merger was officially abandoned. On September 22, 2022, Thomas Rabe, CEO of RTL Group's parent company, Bertelsmann confirmed that Groupe M6 is up for sale, after the failed merger with TF1 Group. On October 3, 2022, RTL Group confirmed that they wouldn't be selling their stake in Groupe M6.

Assets

Television

International

Former channels 
All these channels used to be on Pay-TV.

Radio 
The Groupe M6 acquired RTL France on 1 October 2017, from its main shareholder RTL Group.

Video platforms 
On 19 March 2008, M6 launched its first catchup service, M6 Replay. On 4 November 2013, M6 Replay, W9 Replay and 6ter Replay were merged into 6play. Since late 2017, RTL radios joined 6play.

Film
M6 Films, film co-production
M6 Studio, film production
Société Nouvelle de Cinématographie, film catalog
Société Nouvelle de Distribution (shortened SND Films), film distribution
Studio 89 Productions, television production
C-Productions, television news production
Golden Network, digital content

References

External links 

Television companies of France
Pan-European media companies
Television networks in France
French-language television networks
Television channels and stations established in 1987
RTL Group
1987 establishments in France
Companies based in Île-de-France
Neuilly-sur-Seine